Canada competed at the 2007 World Championships in Athletics with 30 athletes. In order to qualify the athletes had met the world championship qualification standards. The qualification for the world Championship took place in early July at the Windsor Stadium in Windsor, Ontario. The highlighted event at the trials was the Woman's 100m Hurdles featuring "2003 World outdoor and indoor champion Perdita Felicien, Angela Whyte, and Priscilla Lopes who finished 1-3 respectively during the 2006 national championships". The Championships took place in Osaka, Japan in the Nagai Stadium and were the 11th World Championships held under the IAAF sanctions. The event lasted nine days spanning from August 25 to September 2.

Summary 

Three athletes brought home medals from the championships but only two were recognized under the IAAF. Gary Reeds was the favourite to watch going into the championships and brought home the silver medal in the Men's 800m. Reed held the Canadian record in the event with a time of 1:43.68 up until only recently in 2018 when it was broken by Brandon McBride. Reeds impressive performance at the championships captivated the Canadian Athletics fans back home, making it an "exciting moment in Canadian track and field history" The final in the 800m at the championship went out slow and Reed was leading at the bell with only 400m to go. The gold came down to the last two strides, Reed and Kirwa Yego fighting for the gold. With one of the closest margins for victory in world championship history, Yego managed to just out run Reed taking gold.

Competitors

Final Results

Results Legend 
'Q': Automatic Qualifier, 'q': Fastest Loser Qualifier, '-': Did not qualify, 'DQ' - Disqualified, 'n/a' Not applicable, 'NMR': No Mark Recorded) SB: Season's Best, PB: Personal Best, 'EX': Exhibition event, does not count towards official medal count.

Medal Count 
Canada received two medals at the World championships in Osaka both being silver. The gold medal won by Chantal Petitclerc in the Women's 1500m Wheelchair did not count in the total medal count. The event was not seen as an official event by the IAAF but as an exhibition event in the official rankings tables. Canada ranked 25th on the official medal table. Both Gary Reed and Perdita Felicien brought home silver in their respected events.

See also 

 Athletics Canada
 Sport in Canada
2007 World Championships in Athletics

References

External links 

 Team Canada members and results at IAAF.org
 Official Team Canada website at the 2007 World Championships in Athletics

2007
Nations at the 2007 World Championships in Athletics
2007 in Canadian sports